Australian and New Zealand Cultural Arts Limited (ANZCA) is a privately funded not-for-profit institution that assesses music in Australia, New Zealand, Malaysia, Singapore, Indonesia and Thailand. The organisation was developed to be an alternative to the  AMEB, allowing contemporary as well as the traditional classical syllabus. They focus on both Practical and Theoretical components.

History 
In 1982 Nancye Woodford and her Sister June McLean saw the need for a music examination Board that promoted Modern style music along with traditional classical music.   Originally ANZCA was known as the Society of Australasian Arts (SAA) before being formally changed to Australian and New Zealand Cultural Arts (ANZCA)

As news of the fledging society (SAA) spread, interest in the new examinations grew and Teachers signed on in significant numbers.   Music examiners were appointed and the administrative framework established soon SAA's operations were formalised across Australia and New Zealand.   Initially, all matters relating to the conduct of the examination programme were managed from Ivor Morgan's home.   Ivor had been appointed Secretary of the Board.   Later the administrative hub moved to a purpose built office space in June McLean's home, and then (with the increase of Office Staff and equipment to a stand-alone building in Albion Crescent, Greensborough.   Later the Office moved to a purpose built building in the Business area of Greensborough and finally to its current address in the Business Hub in  Rocks Road Nunawading Victoria.

ANZCA commenced examinations in 1983 and was given accreditation as a non-profit organization. The examinations, for a wide variety of instruments, were quickly accepted by teachers and students throughout Australia and New Zealand. In 2006 examinations commenced in S.E.Asia. ANZCA now conducts examinations in seven countries and is still expanding. 

Founders:   

Nancye Woodford

June McLean

Founding Directors:    

Nancye Woodford 

June McLean 

Yvonne Lawn 

 Bill Lock

 Ivor Morgan

Instruments
ANZCA offers exams in the following instruments:

 Classical and Modern Accordion
Modern Bass
Mixed Clarinet
Classical, Modern and Jazz Cornet/Trumpet
Classical Double Bass
Modern Drumkit
Classical and Modern Flute
Classical and Modern Guitar
Modern Keyboard  
Church and Modern Organ
Classical, Modern and 'All Occasions' Piano
Mixed Recorder
Mixed Saxophone
Classical and Modern Singing
Modern Trombone 
Classical Viola
Classical Violin
Classical Cello

Note: Instruments listed as Mixed have a single syllabus that has both Modern and Classical components.

External links
 Official website
https://books.google.com.au/books/about/Music_Theory.html?id=tFPAxwEACAAJ&redir_esc=y
https://www.acnc.gov.au/charity/4f96414f2598d4043a8fd2d6d99b920a#financials-documents  

Educational organisations based in Australia
Music organisations based in Australia
Music organisations based in New Zealand